Angela Paton (January 11, 1930 – May 26, 2016) was an American stage, film, and television actress and theatre director. She co-founded the Berkeley, California-based Berkeley Stage Company. She appeared in stage performances, and in comedy, drama, and thriller films, in roles including Mrs. Lancaster, the innkeeper, in Groundhog Day (1993) and Grandma in American Wedding (2003).

Biography
Paton was born in Brooklyn, New York, in 1930. Described as a "natural comic" and one of the "legends of the local stage" of San Francisco, she was a veteran of the American Conservatory Theater (A.C.T.) and one of the leading actresses in its first few seasons.

After leaving A.C.T. in the early 1970s, Paton and her husband founded and ran the Berkeley Stage Company for a number of years. She appeared in 38 films and over 50 TV series.

Personal life
Paton lived in Los Angeles with her husband, Bob Goldsby, a professor at UC Berkeley's Department of Drama, a stage director with A.C.T., and first director of its conservatory program. Paton died of a heart attack on May 26, 2016.

Filmography

Television

Theatre (selection)

References

External links
 
 ACT’s 40th season — an interview with Angela Paton and Bob Goldsby at the San Francisco Chronicle

1930 births
2016 deaths
20th-century American actresses
21st-century American actresses
Actresses from New York City
American film actresses
American stage actresses
American theatre directors
Women theatre directors
American theatre managers and producers
American television actresses
People from Brooklyn